A fractional currency shield is a  printed "shield" on which is placed 39 different fractional currency notes. 
Produced in 1866 and 1867 by the Treasury Department, the shields were sold to banks for $4.50 each, for the purpose of having a genuine note available to use as a method of counterfeit detection. The 39 notes were printed from the original plates on one side only, the other side left blank, or with the printed word "specimen".

The shields were typically framed by the purchaser and hung on the wall for the convenience of bank employees. Sales were reported to be $14,683.50. Notes appearing on the shields were from the first, second and third issues of Fractional Currency, of the five different issues made. Undamaged shields are rare. It is unknown how many shields exist, but it is believed to be about 600. The printed shield portion exists in three colors, grey (the most common), pink and green. Many Specimen notes of the second and third fractional issue are printed on captured Confederate paper that was taken in 1862 by the Union ship Mercedita from the Confederate blockade runner Bermuda (later, USS Bermuda). The paper was subsequently taken to Philadelphia and sold by the US Government. The paper, produced in Great Britain from seaweed pulp was watermarked CSA (Confederate States America), and originally due to be printed as Confederate paper notes. Many of the specimen notes contain a partial, or complete imprints of the watermark. Examples of the blank paper, with the CSA watermark in full and half sheets exist. Many individual specimen notes (printed on one side only) exist after being removed from shields.

References

Money forgery